Sayf Rahim (formerly Dektur) is a jamoat in Tajikistan. It is located in Baljuvon District in Khatlon Region. The jamoat has a total population of 7,305 (2015).

Notes

References

Populated places in Khatlon Region
Jamoats of Tajikistan